Thomas "Thom" Brooks,  (born 14 October 1973) is an American-British political philosopher and legal scholar. He has been professor of Law and Government at Durham University since 2014, the Dean of Durham Law School since 2016. He was previously a lecturer then Reader at Newcastle University. He has been a visiting scholar at several Ivy League and Russell Group universities. He was the founding editor of the Journal of Moral Philosophy.

Early life and education
Brooks was born on 14 October 1973 in New Haven, Connecticut and raised nearby in Guilford, Connecticut. He was educated at Xavier High School, an all-boys private Catholic school in Middletown, Connecticut, United States. From 1992 to 1997, he studied at William Paterson University. He graduated with a Bachelor of Arts (BA) degree in 1997, majoring in music and political science. He then studied political science at Arizona State University and graduated with a Master of Arts (MA) degree in 1999. He studied for an MA in philosophy at University College Dublin, graduating in 2000 with first class honours. From 2001, he undertook postgraduate research in philosophy at the University of Sheffield under the supervision of Robert Stern and Leif Wenar. He completed his Doctor of Philosophy (PhD) degree in 2004. His doctoral thesis was titled "Taking the System Seriously: Themes in Hegel's Philosophy of Right".

Academic career
Brooks started his academic career at Newcastle University. He was a lecturer in political thought from 2004 to 2007. From 2004 to 2005, he was also a visiting fellow at the Centre for Ethics, Philosophy and Public Affairs, University of St Andrews. In 2007, he was promoted to reader in political and legal philosophy. From 2010 to 2011, he was an academic visitor to the Faculty of Philosophy, University of Oxford and received a visiting fellowship to St John's College, Oxford in 2012. His "Publishing Guide for Graduate Students" is a popular resource for new academics interested in getting published.

In 2012, Brooks joined the Durham Law School, Durham University, as a reader in law, and its Philosophy Department as an associate member. He was appointed professor of Law and Government in 2014. Between 2014 and 2016, he served as Director of the Centre for Criminal Law and Criminal Justice at Durham University. In 2015, he was a visiting fellow to Yale Law School, Yale University.

In 2013, Brooks wrote a report analysing the United Kingdom's new citizenship test. His report was titled "The 'Life in the United Kingdom test': Is It Unfit for Purpose?". He was highly critical of the test, concluding that it was "unfit for purpose". He criticised the test's focus on "British culture and history at the expense of practical knowledge".

Brooks publishes widely on criminal justice and sentencing. His "unified theory of punishment" is noted as one of the top 100 Big Ideas for the Future in a report by RCUK. Brooks has written three books, edited two reports and 23 collections, published over 130 articles and 150 columns. His research on capital punishment is quoted and cited by the Connecticut Supreme Court lead decision in its case of State v. Santiago (Santiago II), 318 Conn. 1, 105 (2015) abolishing capital punishment in Connecticut. In 2015, the Electoral Commission quotes Brooks in support of its proposed changes to the EU Referendum. They proposed changing the ballot choices to "Remain" and "Leave" and this was later accepted by the UK Government.

Since 1 August 2016, he has been Head of the Durham Law School and the school's inaugural Dean. As Dean, Brooks introduced Chinese Law into the LLB and LLM curriculum alongside a new annual Chinese law summer school - the first ever in the UK and first time in English outside Asia.

Brooks appears frequently on media, including television, radio and newspapers often discussing migration policy. He has been interviewed by Andrew Marr.

Brooks is an Advisory Editor of the University of Bologna Law Review, a general student-edited law journal published by the Department of Legal Studies of the University of Bologna.

Personal life
Brooks has been a citizen of the United States since birth. In 2009, he gained indefinite leave to remain in the United Kingdom. He became a citizen of the United Kingdom in 2011, and therefore holds dual citizenship. His report is cited several times in Parliamentary debates. Brooks has been called "the UK's leading expert on the citizenship test". His recommendations for reforming the test have been widely influential.

Brooks is an advisor to the British Labour Party and member of the UNISON trade union. He is the chair of the Sedgefield and Fishburn branch of the Sedgefield Constituency Labour Party. He has made past comments supporting New Labour and Sedgefield's Tony Blair, and supported Liz Kendall in the 2015 Labour leadership contest. He has championed party unity over factionalism. Brooks is a vocal supporter of Labour Leader Keir Starmer, whom he has supported since his election to Parliament in 2015. In 2022, Brooks published a Fabian Society pamphlet New Arrivals: A Fair Immigration System for Labour that presented a new model for a Labour-led post-Brexit points-based system modelled on Starmer's vision.

Brooks writes columns for The Daily Telegraph, The Guardian, The Independent, LabourList, The Times and others often on immigration topics.

Honours
In 2009, Brooks was elected a Fellow of the Academy of Social Sciences (FAcSS). In 2010, he was elected a Fellow of the Royal Historical Society (FRHistS). In 2012, Brooks was elected a Fellow of the Royal Society of Arts (FRSA). In 2014, he was elected a Fellow of the Higher Education Academy (FHEA). In 2018, he became an Academic Bencher of the Honourable Society of Inner Temple.

Selected works

References

External links
 His personal website
 His Durham University website
 Twitter profile
 Thom Brooks – Daily Telegraph
 Thom Brooks – The Independent
 Thom Brooks – The Times
 Thom Brooks WTNH interview with Ann Nyberg
 The Brooks Blog

1973 births
21st-century American philosophers
21st-century British philosophers
Living people
William Paterson University alumni
Arizona State University alumni
Alumni of University College Dublin
Alumni of the University of Sheffield
American columnists
American legal scholars
Analytic philosophers
American political philosophers
American political scientists
American male non-fiction writers
British columnists
British legal scholars
British male journalists
British philosophers
British political philosophers
British political scientists
British writers
The Daily Telegraph people
American democratic socialists
European democratic socialists
The Guardian journalists
Academics of Newcastle University
Academics of Durham University
Fellows of the Academy of Social Sciences
Fellows of the Royal Historical Society
Fellows of the Higher Education Academy
Hegel scholars
Hegelian philosophers
Kant scholars
Labour Party (UK) people
Deans of law schools in the United States
Members of the Inner Temple
Naturalised citizens of the United Kingdom
American opinion journalists
People from Connecticut
People from Guilford, Connecticut
Philosophy academics
Writers from New Haven, Connecticut
Philosophers of law
Political philosophers
The Independent people
The Times people